"" ("The yellow bittern") is a classic poem in Irish by the poet Cathal Buí Mac Giolla Ghunna. In addition to the conventional end-rhyme, it uses internal rhyme ("A bhonnán bhuí, is é mo léan do luí / Is do chnámha sínte tar éis do ghrinn") – in the Irish language all the italicised elements have the same /i/ sound, a technique characteristic of Gaelic poetry of the era.

The poem is in the form of a lament for a bittern that died of thirst, but is also a tongue in cheek defence by the poet of his own drinking habit. It has been translated into English by, among others, James Stephens, Thomas MacDonagh, Thomas Kinsella, and Seamus Heaney. The Irish words have been used as lyrics by the band Clannad on their album Crann Ull (as Bunan Bui) and the English words (MacDonagh version) on Cathie Ryan's album The Music Of What Happens (1998), and also on Al O'Donnell's album "Ramble Away" (2008). Anne Brigg's song "Bonambuie", from her album Sing a Song for You, is based on the MacDonagh version, though using something close to the original Irish title.

The Yellow Bittern is also the name of a 1917 play about the death of Mac Giolla Ghunna by Daniel Corkery.

The version by Thomas MacDonagh is especially notable because in addition to keeping close to the original wording, MacDonagh attempts with considerable success to replicate in English the internal rhyme technique ("His bones are thrown on a naked stone / Where he lived alone like a hermit monk."), and the surreal humour of the Irish version.

Words (Irish original)

A bhonnáin bhuí, is é mo léan do luí,
Is do chnámha sínte tar éis do ghrinn,
Is chan easba bidh ach díobháil dí
a d'fhág i do luí thú ar chúl do chinn.
Is measa liom féin ná scrios na Traoi
Tú bheith i do luí ar leaca lom',
Is nach ndearna tú díth ná dolaidh sa tír,
Is nárbh fhearra leat fíon ná uisce poll.

A bhonnáin álainn, is é mo mhíle crá thú,
Do chúl ar lár amuigh romham sa tslí,
Is gurbh iomaí lá a chluininn do ghrág
Ar an láib is tú ag ól na dí.
Is é an ní a deir cách le do dheartháir Cáthal,
Go bhfaighidh sé bás mar siúd, más fíor,
Ach ní hamhlaidh atá, siúd an préachán breá
Chuaigh in éag ar ball le díth na dí.

A bhonnáin óig, is é mo mhíle brón
Thú bheith sínte fuar i measc na dtom,
Is na luchaí móra ag triall chun do thórraimh,
Ag déanamh spóirt agus pléisiúir ann;
Is dá gcuirfeá scéala in am faoi mo dhéinse
Go raibh tú i ngéibhinn, nó i mbroid fá dheoch,
Do bhrisfinn béim duit ar an loch úd Bhéasaigh
A fhliuchfadh do bhéal is do chorp isteach.

Ní hiad bhur n-éanlaith atá mé ag éagnach,
An lon, an smaolach, nó an chorr ghlas,
Ach mo bhonnán buí, bhí lán de chroí,
Is gur chosúil liom féin é ina ghné is ina dhath.
Bhíodh sé go síoraí ag ól na dí,
Is deir na daoine go mbímse mar sin seal;
Níl aon deor dá bhfaighinn nach ligfinn síos,
Ar eagla go bhfaighinnse bás den tart.

Is é a d'iarr mo stór orm ligint den ól,
Nó nach mbeinnse beo ach seal beag gearr;
Ach dúirt mé léithi go dtug sí an bhréag,
Is gurbh fhaide mo shaolsa an deoch úd a fháil.
Nach bhfaiceann sibh éan an phíobáin réidh
A chuaigh in éag den tart ar ball;
Is a chomharsain chléibh, fliuchaíg bhur mbéal
Óir chan fhaigheann sibh braon i ndiaidh bhur mbáis.

Translations
 Version by Thomas MacDonagh
 Version by Thomas Kinsella
 Updated version by Seamus Heaney

Sources
 Robert Welch (ed.), The Oxford Companion to Irish Literature. Oxford: the Clarendon Press, 1996.

Irish poems
Irish literature